Lippmann, Rosenthal & Co. or Liro Bank originally a Dutch Jewish bank, was seized and used by Nazis for looting Jewish property during the German occupation of the Netherlands during World War II. 

At Nieuwe Spiegelstraat, in Amsterdam, the Germans used the bank's name for a separate branch for looting Jews at the Sarphatistraat.

The branch was used for robbing the Dutch Jews living mainly in Amsterdam of their possessions. Bank accounts at other banks were confiscated, and Jews were also forced to deposit their art collections, jewels etc. at the bank. If a Jewish family was deported from its home, its possessions were sold. The money was used for various purposes such as to finance the Westerbork transit camp. High-level Nazis could pick from the art collections. In addition, important artworks were sent to German museums.

After the war, the original bank had lost its good name and was finally taken over by another bank, the Hollandse Koopmansbank.

In 2003, a plaque about the Nazi robber bank was unveiled on the building of the ABN Amro Bank in Amsterdam.

See also 
 List of claims for restitution for Nazi-looted art 
 Arthur Seyss-Inquart
 The Holocaust in the Netherlands

Further reading 
The Perpetrators and Their Methods Katejan Mühlmann
Nazi looting : the plunder of Dutch Jewry during the Second World War
Reconstructing the Record of Nazi Cultural Plunder: A Survey of the Dispersed Archives of the Einsatzstab Reichsleiter Rosenberg (ERR)

References

External link

Defunct banks of the Netherlands
Banks with year of establishment missing
Banks with year of disestablishment missing
Collaboration with Nazi Germany
Persecution by Nazi Germany
Looting
Nazi-looted art
Companies acquired from Jews under Nazi rule
1940s in Amsterdam
Economy of Amsterdam